Jack "Bus" Bussey (born 17 August 1992) is an English rugby league footballer who plays as a  or  for Featherstone Rovers in the Betfred Championship.

He previously played for the London Broncos, Featherstone Rovers and the Toronto Wolfpack in the Championship.

Background
Bussey was born in Leeds, West Yorkshire, England.

Playing career
He signed for the Toronto Wolfpack from the 2017 season. Bussey made his début in the third round of the 2017 Challenge Cup.

In May 2017 Bussey underwent emergency surgery for thyroid cancer, which was a success with the cancer being removed.

Personal life
Bussey is a keen motorcyclist.

References

External links

Toronto Wolfpack profile
Featherstone Rovers: Bussey has mapped out route to success

1992 births
Living people
English rugby league players
Featherstone Rovers players
London Broncos players
Rugby league locks
Rugby league players from Leeds
Toronto Wolfpack players